Ronald is a masculine given name.

Ronald may also refer to:

Ronald, Minnesota, an unincorporated community in the United States
Ronald, Washington, an unincorporated community in the United States

See also 
Ronald Township, Michigan, a civil township in the United States